The England women's cricket team played against the New Zealand women's cricket team in February and March 2021. The series was played during the time that was originally scheduled to be used to host the 2021 Women's Cricket World Cup, after the tournament was postponed by one year due to the COVID-19 pandemic. The fixtures for the tour were confirmed in January 2021, with three Women's Twenty20 International (WT20I) and three Women's One Day International (WODI) were played. The WT20I matches took place on the same day as the New Zealand men's fixtures at the same venues.

On 27 February 2021, the second WT20I match was moved from Eden Park in Auckland to the Wellington Regional Stadium after Auckland went into lockdown due to the COVID-19 pandemic. The remaining matches were scheduled to be played behind closed doors. However, crowds were allowed to attend the last WT20I after restrictions were relaxed.

On 1 March 2021, the final WT20I was also moved from the Bay Oval in Tauranga to the Wellington Regional Stadium, after logistical complications arose from the movement of the men's T20I matches.

England won the first two WODI matches to take an unassailable lead in the series. New Zealand won the third WODI by seven wickets, ending a losing streak of eleven matches, with England winning the series 2–1. England also won the first two WT20I matches, winning the series with a game to spare. Nat Sciver captained England for the first time in international cricket for the third WT20I match, after Heather Knight was ruled out of the fixture due to an injury. England went on to win the match by 32 runs to take the series 3–0.

Squads

Issy Wong also travelled with the England squad, but was not part of the playing squad. New Zealand's Lea Tahuhu was ruled out for the last two WODIs due to a hamstring injury, with Gabby Sullivan named as replacement. Lea Tahuhu was also ruled out of the WT20I matches, with Brooke Halliday named as her replacement. Gabby Sullivan was added to New Zealand's WT20I squad as injury cover for Hannah Rowe. Nat Sciver captained England for the third WT20I after Heather Knight was ruled out with a hamstring injury.

Tour matches

WODI series

1st WODI

2nd WODI

3rd WODI

WT20I series

1st WT20I

2nd WT20I

3rd WT20I

Notes

References

External links
 Series home at ESPN Cricinfo

England 2020-21
New Zealand 2020-21
International cricket competitions in 2020–21
2021 in New Zealand cricket
cricket
2021 in women's cricket